Man Called Gringo is a 1965 German western film directed by Roy Rowland, written by Clarke Reynolds and Herbert Reinecker and starred by Götz George, Daniel Martín and Alexandra Stewart.

Cast 
 Götz George as Mace Carson
 Alexandra Stewart as Lucy Walton
 Helmut Schmid as Ken Denton
 Sieghardt Rupp as Reno
 Dan Martin as Gringo
 Silvia Solar as Kate Rowland
 Peter Tordy as Sam Martin
 Hugo Pimentez as Mac
 Franco Lantieri as Tinnie
 Valentino Macchi as Tim Walton
 Hilario Fuertes as Dave Walton
 Julio César Semper as Pecos

References

External links 
 

Films directed by Roy Rowland
Films shot in Madrid
1965 films
German Western (genre) films
1965 Western (genre) films
1960s English-language films
1960s German films